Petukhov Log is a rural locality (a settlement) in Srostinsky Selsoviet, Yegoryevsky District, Altai Krai, Russia. The population was 115 as of 2013.

Geography 
Petukhov Log is located 11 km north of Novoyegoryevskoye (the district's administrative centre) by road. Srosty and Novoyegoryevskoye are the nearest rural localities.

References 

Rural localities in Yegoryevsky District, Altai Krai